"Wake Up, Stop Dreaming" is the second single from the To Live and Die in L.A. soundtrack by English new wave band Wang Chung. It was released in 1985.

References

1985 singles
Wang Chung (band) songs
Songs written by Jack Hues
Songs written by Nick Feldman
1985 songs
Geffen Records singles